The Château de Saint-Cloud was a château in France, built on a site overlooking the Seine at Saint-Cloud in Hauts-de-Seine, about  west of Paris. On the site of the former palace is the state-owned Parc de Saint-Cloud.

The château was expanded by Phillipe of France, Duke of Orléans in the 17th century, and by Marie Antoinette in the 1780s. After occupation by Napoleon I and Napoleon III, it was destroyed in 1870 during the Franco-Prussian War.

History

Hôtel d'Aulnay

The Hôtel d'Aulnay on the site was expanded into a château in the 16th century by the Gondi banking family. The Gondis stemmed from a family of Florentine bankers established at Lyon in the first years of the 16th century, who had arrived at the court of France in 1543 in the train of Catherine de' Medici. In the 1570s, the Queen offered Jérôme de Gondi a dwelling at Saint-Cloud, the Hôtel d'Aulnay, which became the nucleus of the château with a right-angled wing that looked out on a terrace.

The main front faced south, with a wing that terminated in a pavilion affording a handsome view over the Seine River. Henry III of France installed himself in this house in order to conduct the siege of Paris during the Wars of Religion. In 1589 he was assassinated there by the monk Jacques Clément.

17th century 

After the death of Jérôme de Gondi in 1604, his son Jean-Baptiste II de Gondi sold the château to Jean de Bueil, Comte de Sancerre, who died shortly afterward. The château was bought back by Jean-François de Gondi, archbishop of Paris. His embellishment notably included gardens by Thomas Francine.

After the death of Jean-François de Gondi in 1654, the château was inherited by Philippe-Emmanuel de Gondi and then by his nephew Henri de Gondi, known as the Duke of Retz. The latter sold the property in 1655 to Barthélemy Hervart, a banker of German extraction who was intendant then surintendant des finances. He enlarged the park to 12 hectares and did considerable rebuilding. He built a grande cascade (not the present one) in the park.

Garden details that seem to be of this phase of Saint-Cloud were drawn by Israël Silvestre. It was built in the Italian style, with an invisibly flat roof and frescoed façades. Its gardens descended in a series of terraces to the Seine, with fountains at each level.

On 8 October 1658, Hervart organised a sumptuous feast at Saint-Cloud in honour of the young Louis XIV, his brother, "Monsieur", Philippe of France, Duke of Orléans, their mother Anne of Austria and Cardinal Mazarin. On 25 October, Monsieur bought the château and its grounds for 240,000 livres.

It appears that Mazarin pressed the sale, contributing to a policy of building a network of royal châteaux to the west of Paris and relieving the excessively enriched Hervart from the fate of Nicolas Fouquet, whose fête at Vaux-le-Vicomte precipitated his fall and imprisonment.

Monsieur was engaged in building operations at Saint-Cloud until his death in 1701. The works were designed and constructed by his architect Antoine Le Pautre, who built the wings in 1677. The château as it was reconstructed for Monsieur took the form of a "U" open to the east, towards the Seine, with the Gondi château, which had faced south, integrated into its left wing. To the rear, a long orangery formed a wing that prolonged the right wing of the court. The entrance avenue, bordered by dependencies, some of which survive, arrived on an angle from the bridge.

Inside, the apartment of "Madame", Princess Henrietta of England, in the left wing was decorated by Jean Nocret in 1660, and the 45-metre Galerie d'Apollon, which occupied the whole of the right wing, was decorated with myths of Apollo by Pierre Mignard (finished in 1680).

The last child of Philippe and Henrietta was born here in 1669 and named Anne Marie d'Orléans. She was the maternal grandmother of Louis XV of France.

The château was the site of the 1670 death of Princess Henrietta, for whose funeral Jacques-Bénigne Bossuet composed the oration.

In October 1677, five days of magnificent feasts in Louis XIV's honour inaugurated the new decorations and demonstrated the splendour of Monsieur's ménage. The Galerie was preceded and followed by a salon at either end, a measure to be taken up at Versailles, where Louis found himself outdone in the matter of magnificent galleries, both by his brother and by his mistress in the Château de Clagny, and set out in 1678 to build the Galerie at Versailles.

Following Le Pautre's death in 1679, the work was continued by his executive assistant Jean Girard, a master mason rather than a full-fledged architect, and perhaps by Thomas Gobert. Jules Hardouin Mansart intervened towards the end of the century, designing a grand stair in the left wing in the manner of the Ambassadors' Staircase at Versailles.

André Le Nôtre replanned the gardens, and the park took on the dimensions it retains today. The Grande Cascade, constructed by Le Pautre in 1664-65, has survived. Hardouin-Mansart added the basin and the lowermost canal in 1698.

A total of 156,000 livres is estimated to have been spent over the years.

18th century 

Saint-Cloud descended in the family of Monsieur's heirs, the Dukes of Orléans, and remained in their hands for most of the 18th century.

After protracted negotiations, the château de Saint-Cloud was bought in 1785 by Louis XVI for Marie Antoinette, who was convinced that the air there would be good for her children. Louis Philippe d'Orléans, Duke of Orléans, who had not visited the château since his morganatic marriage with Madame de Montesson, was induced to part with it for 6,000,000 livres.

After the sale of the palace was officially finished, Marie Antoinette set about transforming her new private home. She set to transforming Saint-Cloud in 1787-88 by her preferred architect Richard Mique, who enlarged the corps de logis and the adjacent half of the right wing; he rebuilt the garden front. Hardouin-Mansart's staircase was demolished in favour of new stone stairs leading into the state apartments.

The château was at first refurnished from the Garde Meuble with furnishings collected from other royal residences, but soon furniture was commissioned for Saint-Cloud. Gilded chairs and marquetry commodes with gilt-bronze mounts in the richest Louis XVI style were being delivered to Saint-Cloud right up to the opening days of the French Revolution. In 1790, Saint-Cloud was the setting for the famous interview between Marie Antoinette and Mirabeau.

The château was declared a bien national and emptied by the Revolutionary sales.

The Saint-Cloud orangery was the setting for the coup d'état of 18 Brumaire (10 November 1799), in which the Directoire was suppressed and the Consulat declared. Napoléon Bonaparte was proclaimed Emperor of the French on 18 May 1804 at Saint-Cloud. Saint-Cloud was later used by the Emperor’s family and was their main seat along with the Palais des Tuileries in Paris.

19th century 

Napoleon made Saint-Cloud his preferred residence and transformed the Salon de Vénus to a throne room, which Saint-Cloud had naturally lacked, but neither he nor the occupants to follow did much more to Saint-Cloud than interior decoration. When the Prussians captured it in 1814, they supposedly found Altdorfer's The Battle of Alexander at Issus hanging in the Emperor's bathroom.

It was at Saint-Cloud once again, in Monsieur's Galerie d'Apollon, that Napoléon III invested himself as Emperor of the French on 1 December 1852. During the Second Empire, Napoléon III and empress Eugénie held court at Saint-Cloud in the spring and the autumn. Napoléon III had the orangery demolished in 1862, and Eugénie transformed the bedroom of Madame into a salon in the Louis XVI style. The castle was used during much of the nineteenth century to welcome members of European royal families. For example, Queen Victoria and Prince Albert stayed at Saint Cloud when they came to visit Paris for the first Exposition Universelle (1855).

At Saint-Cloud, Napoléon III declared war on Prussia on 28 July 1870. The heights dominating Paris were occupied by the Prussians during the siege of Paris, who shelled Paris from the grounds of the château. Counter-fire from the French hit the building, and it caught fire and burned out on 13 October 1870. Much of its contents had been removed by Eugénie after war was declared.

The standing roofless walls were finally razed in 1891. The pediment of the château's right wing, one of the preserved parts of the building, was bought by Ferdinand I of Bulgaria and integrated in his palace Euxinograd on the Black Sea coast.

Today, only a few outbuildings and its park of 460 hectares remain, constituting the Domaine national de Saint-Cloud. It includes the garden à la française designed by Le Nôtre, Marie Antoinette's flower garden (where roses for the French state are grown), a garden à l'anglaise from the 1820s (the Trocadéro garden),  ten fountains, and a viewpoint of Paris known as "la lanterne", because a lantern was lit there when Napoléon I was in residence.

The Pavillon de Breteuil in the park has been the home of the General Conference on Weights and Measures since 1875.

20th century 

The sculpture group France crowning Art and Industry was installed in the lower part of the park in 1900.

Many thousands of trees in the park were knocked down or badly damaged in a storm on 26 December 1999, but restoration work continues.

21st century 

The park has been the venue for the Rock en Seine festival since 2003.

Rebuilding the Château de Saint-Cloud 
Since December 2006 there has been a movement to reconstruct the château de Saint-Cloud, chiefly led by an association and aiming at a primarily privately financed project rather than a government one. The association, "Reconstruisons Saint-Cloud !" or "Reconstruct Saint-Cloud !", was created in 2006 and aims to fund the rebuilding by imposing a fee on visitors.

See also

 Railway of the Prince Imperial
 List of Baroque residences

References 

 Fiske Kimball, Creation of the Rococo, (Philadelphia Museum of Art) 1943.

External links 

 Official site of the Domaine National de Saint-Cloud
 History of Saint-Cloud 
 Reconstruisons Saint-Cloud ! 
 Reconstruct Saint-Cloud ! 

Saint-Cloud
Saint-Cloud
Saint-Cloud
Saint-Cloud
Palaces and residences of Napoleon
Ancien Régime French architecture
Baroque buildings in France
Châteaux with formal gardens in France
Gardens in Hauts-de-Seine
1572 establishments in France
Monuments of the Centre des monuments nationaux